West Renfrewshire and Renfrewshire West may mean or refer to:

 West Renfrewshire (UK Parliament constituency)
 West Renfrewshire (Scottish Parliament constituency)
 Inverclyde, the council area containing the western part of the county of Renfrewshire